Guilty Crown is a 2011 sci-fi anime series that aired on Fuji TV's noitaminA program block. The anime is produced by Production I.G and directed by Tetsurō Araki with script supervision by Hiroyuki Yoshino, also assisted by Ichirō Ōkouchi and with Jin Hanegaya from Nitroplus helping to write the screenplay. The mechanical designs were provided by Atsushi Takeuchi and prop designs by Yō Moriyama. Art direction was handled by Yusuke Takeda with original character designs by Redjuice and Hiromi Katō adapting the character designs for the anime.

Set in the year 2039, Japan is the under the rule of a multinational military force called GHQ after the country went into chaos due to the "Lost Christmas" incident ten years prior to the start of the series, when a giant outbreak of an alien virus called the Apocalypse Virus spreads during Christmas, causing the United Nations to send GHQ to contain the outbreak and restore order. The series follows Shu Ouma, an intelligent yet socially awkward teenager who finds himself caught in the war between GHQ and Funeral Parlor (Undertakers), a resistance organization led by Gai Tsutsugami, which aims to liberate Japan from GHQ, when he meets Inori Yuzuriha, the famous Internet Singer of the band Egoist and a member of the Undertakers. Due to various circumstances, Shu acquires a genetic weapon called the Void Genome, also known as "Power of the King", which allows him to extract "Voids", objects with special properties that reflect the personality of their owners from underage individuals. With his new powers, Shu joins Funeral Parlor to protect Inori and learns secrets and mysteries he never knew.

The anime aired on Fuji TV's noitaminA program block from October 13, 2011 to March 22, 2012.

Episode list

References
General

Specific

External links
Official anime website 

Guilty Crown